Kate Gordon is an Australian writer of young adult fiction.

Biography
Gordon was born in 1982 in Tasmania, Australia. Gordon has studied Performing Arts and Information Management at the University of Tasmania, and Literary Studies at Deakin University. Prior to writing, she has worked as a librarian and bookseller, specialising in children's and young adult books.

In 2010, her first novel was published by Allen & Unwin, entitled Three Things About Daisy Blue, the twentieth and final novel in the Girlfriend Fiction series.  In 2011, her second novel, Thyla was published by Random House Australia. Unlike her first novel, Thyla is a paranormal fiction, set in Hobart, Tasmania and its surroundings. It was inspired by a visit to the Cascades Female Factory historical site, and also a story written for her by her father about a thylacine named Tessa.  The sequel to Thyla, entitled Vulpi, was released in April 2012.

Her 2020 book, Aster's Good, Right Things, won the 2021 Children's Book of the Year Award: Younger Readers.

Bibliography

Novels

The Heartsong of Wonder Quinn. UQP. 2020. .
Aster's Good, Right Things. Yellow Brick Books. 2020. .
The Ballad of Melodie Rose. UQP. 2021. .
Juno Jones, Rival Reader. Yellow Brick Books. 2021. .
 Xavier in the Meantime. Yellow Brick Books. 2022. .

Picture Books

Anthologies

Critical studies and reviews

References

External links

Official site
Rhiza Edge author page

1982 births
Australian children's writers
Living people
Writers from Tasmania
Australian women children's writers
Australian women novelists